Pipo Hieu Nguyen-duy (born 1962) is a fine art photographer, and a professor of Photography at Oberlin College.

Early life
Pipo was born in Hue, Vietnam in 1962. As a teenager, he competed on the Vietnamese national table tennis team. In 1975 at age 13, he left Vietnam for the United States as a boat person. Pipo graduated from Carleton College in Northfield, Minnesota in 1983 with a BA in Economics after which he moved to New York.

Career

Pipo completed his Master of Arts in Photography from the University of New Mexico, Albuquerque in 1992 and his Masters of Fine Arts in 1995.

Pipo has received many awards and grants including a Guggenheim Fellowship in Photography, a National Endowment for the Arts, an En Foco Grant; a Professional Development Grant from the College Arts Association; an American Photography Institute’s National Graduate Fellowship, NYC; a fellowship from the Oregon Arts Commission in Salem, Oregon; a B. Wade and Jane B. White Fellowship in the Humanities at Oberlin College; and two Individual Artists Fellowship from the Ohio Arts Council in Columbus, Ohio. He participated as an artist-in-residence at Monet’s Garden through The Lila Wallace-Reader’s Digest Artists at Giverny Fellowship, at the Headlands Center for the Arts in Sausalito, California , in Light Work’s Artist-in-Residence program.

His work has been exhibited and are in public collections in the United States, Europe, Asia and South America. He is represented by Sam Lee Gallery in Los Angeles, California.

Pipo is a Professor teaching photography at Oberlin College in Oberlin, Ohio. 

In 2011, Pipo won a Guggenheim Fellowship in the field of photography.

Books & significant catalogues
The inscrutable traveller: the photographs of Tseng Kwong Chi, University of New Mexico, 1998
A thousand deaths Pipo, University of New Mexico, 1993

References

External links
http://art.uga.edu/index.php?pt=4&id=111
http://www2.kenyon.edu/artgallery/exhibitions/0405/n-duy/n-duy.htm

Living people
Photographers from Oregon
1962 births
People from Ashland, Oregon
Oberlin College faculty
Carleton College alumni
University of New Mexico alumni
Vietnamese emigrants to the United States
Artists of Vietnamese descent
Academics of Vietnamese descent
Fine art photographers